Harry Atkinson was a South African international lawn bowler

Bowls career
Atkinson won a gold medal at the 1950 British Empire Games in the rinks (fours) event with Herbert Currer, Alfred Blumberg and Norman Snowy Walker.

References

South African male bowls players
Commonwealth Games gold medallists for South Africa
Bowls players at the 1950 British Empire Games
Commonwealth Games medallists in lawn bowls
Medallists at the 1950 British Empire Games